The LX Legislature (60th) of the Congress of Mexico met from September 1, 2006, to September 1, 2009. All members of both the lower and upper houses of Congress were elected in the elections of July 2006.

Members of the LX Legislature by state

Senators by state

Plurinominal Senators

Senate Bodies
The Senate has 2 directive bodies: The Executive Board and The Politic Coordination Committee. The bodies are listed as follows:

Executive Board of the Senate
President of the Senate:
Manlio Fabio Beltrones (PRI, Party list Senator)
Vice Presidents of the Senate:
Francisco Arroyo Vieyra (PRI, Guanajuato)
Ricardo Torres Origel (PAN, Party list Senator)
Yeidckol Polevnsky (PRD, Mexico State)
Secretaries:
Cleominio Zoreda Novelo (PRI, Yucatan)
Rodolfo Dorador (PAN, Durango)
Claudia Corichi García (PRD, Party list Senator)
Ludivina Menchaca (PVEM, Quintana Roo)
Politic Coordination Committee of the Senate
President of the Committee:
Santiago Creel (PAN, Party list Senator)
Vocals:
Manlio Fabio Beltrones (PRI, Party list Senator)
Carlos Navarrete Ruiz (PRD. Party list Senator)
Francisco Agundis Arias (PVEM, Party list Senator)
Dante Delgado Rannauro (CD, Veracruz)
Humberto Aguilar Coronado (PAN, Puebla)
Felipe González González (PAN, Aguascalientes)
Melquiades Morales (PRI, Puebla)

Deputies by state and electoral district

Plurinominal Deputies

Substitute Deputies

Chamber of Deputies Organism
Like the Senate, the Chamber of Deputies has 2 directive organisms: The Executive Board and The Political Coordination Committee. The leaders of the Chamber of Deputies are listed as follows:

Executive Board of the Chamber of Deputies
President of the Chamber of Deputies Directive Board:
Ruth Zavaleta Salgado (PRD)
Vice Speakers of the Chamber:
Secretaries:
Political Coordination Committee of the Chamber of Deputies
President of the Committee:
Emilio Gamboa Patrón (PRI)
Coordinators:
Héctors Larios (PAN)
Javier González Garza (PRD)
Ricardo Cantú (PT)
Gloria Lavara (PVEM)
Alejandro Chanona (CD)
Miguel Ángel Jiménez Godínez (PANAL)
Aída Marina Arvizu Rivas (PASDC)

Members of the LX Legislature by party

Party strengths in the Chamber of Deputies

|-
! style="background-color:#E9E9E9;text-align:center;" colspan=3 |Parties and/or coalitions
! style="background-color:#E9E9E9;text-align:center;" |Votes
! style="background-color:#E9E9E9;text-align:center;" |%
! style="background-color:#E9E9E9;text-align:center;" |FPP
! style="background-color:#E9E9E9;text-align:center;" |PR
! style="background-color:#E9E9E9;text-align:center;" |Total seats
|-
| style="background-color:#3333FF;" |  
| style="text-align:left;" colspan=2 |National Action Party (Partido Acción Nacional)
| style="vertical-align:top;" |13,845,121
| style="vertical-align:top;" |33.41
| style="vertical-align:top;" |137
| style="vertical-align:top;" |69
| style="vertical-align:top;" |206
|-
|rowspan=4 style="background-color:#FFE153" |  
| style="text-align:left;" rowspan=4|Coalition for the Good of All(Coalición por el Bien de Todos)
| style="text-align:left;" |Party of the Democratic Revolution (Partido de la Revolución Democrática)
| style="vertical-align:top;" rowspan=4|12,013,364
| style="vertical-align:top;" rowspan=4|28.99
| style="vertical-align:top;" |91
| style="vertical-align:top;" |36
| style="vertical-align:top;" |127
|-
| style="text-align:left;" |Convergence (Convergencia)
|5
|12
|17
|-  
| style="text-align:left;" |Labour Party (Partido del Trabajo)
|2
|10
|12
|-
| style="text-align:left;" | No party
| style="vertical-align:top;" |0
| style="vertical-align:top;" |1
| style="vertical-align:top;" |1
|-
|rowspan=2 style="background-color:#CC0000" |
| style="text-align:left;" rowspan=2|Alliance for Mexico (Alianza por México)
| style="text-align:left;" |Institutional Revolutionary Party (Partido Revolucionario Institucional)
| style="vertical-align:top;" rowspan=2|11,676,585
| style="vertical-align:top;" rowspan=2|28.18
| style="vertical-align:top;" |65
| style="vertical-align:top;" |41
| style="vertical-align:top;" |106
|-
| style="text-align:left;" |Ecologist Green Party of Mexico (Partido Verde Ecologista de México)
|0
|17
|17
|-   
| style="background-color:#2DBBEA;" | 
| colspan=2 style="text-align:left;" | New Alliance Party (Partido Nueva Alianza)
| style="vertical-align:top;" |1,883,476
| style="vertical-align:top;" |4.55
| style="vertical-align:top;" |0
| style="vertical-align:top;" |9
| style="vertical-align:top;" |9
|-
| style="background-color:#FF3300;" |
| colspan=2 style="text-align:left;" | Social Democratic and Peasant Alternative Party (Partido Alternativa Socialdemócrata y Campesina)
| style="vertical-align:top;" |850,989
| style="vertical-align:top;" |2.05
| style="vertical-align:top;" |0
| style="vertical-align:top;" |4
| style="vertical-align:top;" |4
|-
|style="text-align:left;background-color:#E9E9E9" colspan=3|Total
|width="75" style="text-align:right;background-color:#E9E9E9"|41,435,934
|width="30" style="text-align:right;background-color:#E9E9E9"|100.00
|width="30" style="text-align:right;background-color:#E9E9E9"|300
|width="30" style="text-align:right;background-color:#E9E9E9"|200
|width="30" style="text-align:right;background-color:#E9E9E9"|500
|-
| style="text-align:left;" colspan=8 |Source: Chamber of Deputies

Party strengths in the Senate

|-
! style="background-color:#E9E9E9;text-align:center;" colspan=3 |Parties and/or coalitions
! style="background-color:#E9E9E9;text-align:center;" |Votes
! style="background-color:#E9E9E9;text-align:center;" |%
! style="background-color:#E9E9E9;text-align:center;" |FPP
! style="background-color:#E9E9E9;text-align:center;" |FM
! style="background-color:#E9E9E9;text-align:center;" |PR
! style="background-color:#E9E9E9;text-align:center;" |Total seats
|-
| style="background-color:#3333FF;" |  
| style="vertical-align:top;text-align:left;" colspan=2|National Action Party (Partido Acción Nacional)
| style="vertical-align:top;" |14,035,503
| style="vertical-align:top;" |33.63
| style="vertical-align:top;" |32
| style="vertical-align:top;" |9
| style="vertical-align:top;" |11
| style="vertical-align:top;" |52
|-
|rowspan=3 style="background-color:#FFE153" |    
| style="text-align:left;" rowspan=3|Coalition for the Good of All(Coalición por el Bien de Todos)
| style="text-align:left;" |Party of the Democratic Revolution (Partido de la Revolución Democrática)
| style="vertical-align:middle;" rowspan=3|12,397,008
| style="vertical-align:middle;" rowspan=3|29.70
| style="vertical-align:top;" |22
| style="vertical-align:top;" |4
| style="vertical-align:top;" |5
| style="vertical-align:top;" |31
|-
| style="text-align:left;" |Labour Party (Partido del Trabajo)
|0
|0
|3
|3
|-
| style="text-align:left;" |Convergence (Convergencia)
|0
|0
|2
|2
|-    
|rowspan=2 style="background-color:#CC0000" |
| style="text-align:left;" rowspan=2|Alliance for Mexico (Alianza por México)
| style="text-align:left;" |Institutional Revolutionary Party (Partido Revolucionario Institucional)
| style="vertical-align:middle;" rowspan=2|11,681,395
| style="vertical-align:middle;" rowspan=2|27.99
| style="vertical-align:top;" |10
| style="vertical-align:top;" |19
| style="vertical-align:top;" |6
| style="vertical-align:top;" |35
|-
| style="text-align:left;" |Ecologist Green Party of Mexico (Partido Verde Ecologista de México)
|0
|0
|4
|4
|-   
| style="background-color:#2DBBEA;" | 
| colspan=2 style="text-align:left;" | New Alliance Party (Partido Nuevo Alianza)
| style="vertical-align:top;" |1,688,198
| style="vertical-align:top;" |4.04
| style="vertical-align:top;" |0
| style="vertical-align:top;" |0
| style="vertical-align:top;" |1
| style="vertical-align:top;" |1
|-
| style="background-color:#FF3300;" |
| style="vertical-align:top;text-align:left;" colspan=2 | Social Democratic and Peasant Alternative Party {Partido Alternativa Socialdemócrata y Campesina)
| style="vertical-align:top;" |795,730
| style="vertical-align:top;" |1.91
| style="vertical-align:top;" |0
| style="vertical-align:top;" |0
| style="vertical-align:top;" |0
| style="vertical-align:top;" |0
|-
|style="text-align:left;background-color:#E9E9E9" colspan=3|Total
|width="75" style="text-align:right;background-color:#E9E9E9"|41,739,188
|width="30" style="text-align:right;background-color:#E9E9E9"|100.00
|width="30" style="text-align:right;background-color:#E9E9E9"|64
|width="30" style="text-align:right;background-color:#E9E9E9"|32
|width="30" style="text-align:right;background-color:#E9E9E9"|32
|width="30" style="text-align:right;background-color:#E9E9E9"|128
|-
| style="text-align:left;" colspan=9 |Source: Senate

Congress of Mexico by session